Nannoarctia tripartita is a moth of the family Erebidae first described by Francis Walker in 1855. It is found in Myanmar, Thailand, Laos and Yunnan, China.

Description
The length of the Nannoarctia tripartita forewings is 15–18 mm for females and 14–17 mm for males.

The forewings of the females are dark brown, with a transverse (slightly oblique) band and several spots. The hindwings are yellow, with a large dark discal spot and three other spots.

The forewings of the males are brown, with a transverse oblique postdiscal band and several spots. The hindwings are yellow, with a brown costal margin, a confluent discal spot, a wide stroke at the apex, and an angulated spot at the tornus.

References

Spilosomina
Moths of Asia
Moths described in 1855